The Ambient Collection is a 1990 album compiling songs by the Art of Noise into a chill-out mix. The album was compiled and remixed by Youth, using songs from the Art of Noise albums In Visible Silence and In No Sense? Nonsense!, as well as the song "Island" from Below the Waste. The album spawned one single, "Art of Love", which uses elements from the Art Of Noise tracks "One Earth", "Crusoe", "Opus 4" and "Camilla".

Track listing
 Opus 4 (0:42)
 Opus for 4 (3:46)
 Nothing Was Going to Stop Them Then, Anyway (0:44)
 Crusoe (5:03)
 Island (5:40)
 Camilla (7:56)
 Ode to Don Jose (4:14)
 Counterpoint (0:56)
 Roundabout 727/Ransom in the Sand (2:08)
 Eye of a Needle (4:43)
 Robinson Crusoe (4:02)
 A Nation Rejects (4:45)
 Art of Love (7" Edition) (4:36)

Credits
 Compiled and remixed by Youth
 All tracks produced, arranged and performed by the Art of Noise except:
 "Island," "Robinson Crusoe," "A Nation Rejects" produced by Anne Dudley, J. J. Jeczalik, and Ted Hayton
 "Art of Love (7" Edition) additional production by Youth
 Written by:
 Tracks 1, 6, 10, 13: Anne Dudley, J. J. Jeczalik, Gary Langan
 Tracks 2–5, 7, 9, 12: Anne Dudley, J. J. Jeczalik
 Track 8: Anne Dudley
 Track 9a: J.J. Jeczalik
 Track 11: Gian Piero Reverberi, Robert Mellin

References 

Art of Noise albums
1990 remix albums
China Records remix albums
Ambient remix albums